The family of Al-Saggoff (transliterated elsewhere al-Saqqaf, al-Saggaf or al-Saqqāf) were Arab Singaporean spice traders of Hadhrami origin, who became influential by marrying into a royal family from the Celebes (now Sulawesi, Indonesia). They acquired many properties, like the other Arab families, including the "Perseverance Estate" where they grew lemon grass. The estate is now considered to be the heart of the Muslim community in Singapore, with the Alsagoff family still retaining its prominence there. They originally belong to the Ba'Alawi clan of the Bani Hashim in Hadhramaut. Hence, they are a Ba'Alawi Sayyid family. Then-master-chef of the family, Mr. Abdul-Rahman established a restaurant named "Islamic" in 1921 in Singapore, which is functioning till date. As well as being successful merchants and land owners, the family became involved in civic affairs. The family members, at times, held civic office from the 1870s, until Singaporean independence in 1965.

Members

Syed Abdur-Rahman 
Syed Abdul Rahman Alsagoff came to Singapore with his son Ahmad. Their family would later start the Arabic School in Jalan Sultan, in 1912. As a Sayyid, Abdur-Rahman was a descendant of the Islamic Prophet Muhammad. A large section of Geylang, formally "Geylang Serai," formed part of the 'Perseverance Estate' which belonged to Syed Ahmad. The Alsagoffs had also served as Municipal commissioners of Singapore, from 1872 to 1898, and 1928 to 1933.

Syed Ahmad ibn Abdur-Rahman 

Sayyid Aḥmad ibn ʿAbdur-Raḥmān As-Saqqāf, like his father, was a merchant. In 1848, he established the Alsagoff Company.

Ahmad married Raja Siti, daughter of Hajjah Fatimah, who was a local aristocrat, thus strengthening his family's presence in Singapore. Syed Mohamed bin Syed Ahmad was their son. The family, whose name became 'Alsagoff', would get involved in a number of philanthropic activities, such as financing the Masjid of Hajjah Fatimah on Beach Road in Kampong Glam. The graves of Sayyid Ahmad, and his wife and mother-in-law, are in the premises of this Masjid.

Syed Mohamed bin Ahmed 
Syed Mohammad was the most prominent member of the family. He received two land concessions from Sultan Abu Bakar of Johor; one in Kukup, where he could print his own currency, and the other in Kampong Nong Chik. He was also involved in Singapore's civil service undertaking several diplomatic posts. The first post he held was the Ottoman consul, where the Osmanieh Order inducted him into their ranks after he became consul. Syed Mohamed was also asked to conduct diplomacy on behalf of the Sultanate of Aceh during its conflict with the Dutch.

He owned a large estate where his nephew, Syed Omar Alsagoff, lived in a palatial bungalow and entertained Europeans lavishly, at what is now Kampong Bukit Tunggal, near Chancery Lane. He served dinners on gold plated plates, forks and knives. There was also a lake there which was one of the attractions of old Singapore and canoes could be seen afloat in it. After his death, his sons developed the Bukit Tunggal Estate in the 1920s. The Alsagoffs had additional property in Beach Road and also the former owners of the Raffles Hotel. The tomb (or Keramat) of the holy man Habib Nuh bin Muhammad Al-Habshi built by Syed Mohamed in about 1890 is still maintained by the Alsagoff family.

Other members 
 The Kingdom of Iraq's Honorary Consul was Syed Ibrahim bin Syed Omar Alsagoff. The government of Saudi Arabia later tapped him as their ambassador, becoming the Consul-General, and later the Honorary Consul for Turkey and Tunisia.
 Syed Mohamed bin Ahmad Alsagoff commander of the Malaysian armed forces in Singapore from 1963 to 1965.
 Politician ʿAli Redha.
 Khadijah ʿAbdullah, managing partner of an Egyptian magazine for women, and manager of the Raffles Hotel, in the 1960s.
 Faisal, co-founder of Horizon Education and Technologies Ltd.

Jeddah Incident and Lord Jim 
Outside Singapore among the historical events associated with the family was the S.S. Jeddah incident when the captain and crew abandoned the ship S.S. Jeddah, with hundreds of religious pilgrims on board, due to ship damage. After the captain and crew arrived in Aden, the Jeddah was brought in by a second ship which found it and hauled it back saving the passengers. This incident is believed to be the inspiration for the Joseph Conrad novel Lord Jim.

See also 
 Banu Hashim
 Hadhramawt
 Islam in Singapore
 Quraysh
 Yemen

References 

https://eresources.nlb.gov.sg/infopedia/articles/SIP_776_2004-12-29.html
https://web.archive.org/web/20090813121751/http://www.raffles.com/EN_RA/Property/RHS/History/
https://eresources.nlb.gov.sg/infopedia/articles/SIP_685_2005-01-12.html
http://www.streetdirectory.com/travel_guide/singapore/historical_sites/267/the_alkaff_mansion.php
1850s - Steamships as a Way to Mecca - a short documentary about the Alsagoffs who invested in steamboats to ferry pilgrims to Mecca in the 19th century, produced for the Singapore Bicentennial in 2019.

Hadhrami people
Singaporean people of Yemeni descent